The Rude Awakening is the second studio album by American hip hop duo Smif-N-Wessun. It was released on March 31, 1998 via Priority Records under the name Cocoa Brovaz. The duo was forced to drop their original name after they were sued by the Smith & Wesson firearms company. Production was handled by several record producers, including Da Beatminerz, Sean C, Self, Shaleek, Shawn J Period and member Steele.

The album peaked at number 21 on the Billboard 200 and number 3 on the Top R&B/Hip-Hop Albums. The lead single from the album was "Black Trump", which features Raekwon of the Wu-Tang Clan. Their 1997 single "Won On Won" from the Soul in the Hole soundtrack is included here, as well as the singles "Spanish Harlem" and "Bucktown USA".

Track listing

Music videos
"Won on Won"Released: 1997
"Black Trump"Director: G. ThomasReleased: 1998
"Spanish Harlem"Released: 1998

Charts

Singles chart positions

References

External links

1998 albums
Smif-n-Wessun albums
Duck Down Music albums
Priority Records albums
Albums produced by Grind Music
Albums produced by Da Beatminerz